Dulce Nombre de María Urdiaín Muro (25 November 1925 – 27 February 2013), better known as María Asquerino, was a Spanish film actress.

Filmography

Awards

References

External links 
 

Spanish film actresses
1926 births
2013 deaths
Actresses from Madrid
Best Supporting Actress Goya Award winners